Mansa Wati (French: "Ouati") was the third mansa of the Mali Empire reigning from 1270 to 1274.

Mansa Wati was one of two adopted children from among Sunjata's generals.  
He was raised in the royal court as a prince alongside the previous mansa Uli and another adopted sibling named Khalifa. Like any blood member of the Keita clan, he was eligible for the throne and fought for it against Khalifa after Mansa Wali's death shortly after his return from the hajj.  Wati succeeded in gaining the throne but ruled only four, tumultuous years. By the time of his death in 1274, the empire of Sunjata was in ruins.  

With Wati out of the way, Khalifa returned to the capital of Niani and seized the throne, sidelining Sunjata's brother again. Mansa Wati is remembered as a bad ruler, and Khalifa would prove even worse.

Sources
Research on the Mali Empire in the Golden Age

External links
Early Malian biographies

See also
Mali Empire
Keita Dynasty

1274 deaths
People of the Mali Empire
Mansas of Mali
13th-century monarchs in Africa
Year of birth unknown
Keita family